Deerfield Township is one of the sixteen townships of Ross County, Ohio, United States.  The 2000 census found 1,096 people in the township, 580 of whom lived in the unincorporated portions of the township.

Geography
Located in the northwestern corner of the county, it borders the following townships:
Perry Township, Pickaway County - north, west of Deer Creek Township
Deer Creek Township, Pickaway County - north, east of Perry Township
Wayne Township, Pickaway County - northeast
Union Township - southeast
Concord Township - southwest
Wayne Township, Fayette County - west
Marion Township, Fayette County - northwest corner

The village of Clarksburg is located in northern Deerfield Township.

Name and history
Statewide, other Deerfield Townships are located in Morgan, Portage, and Warren counties.

Government
The township is governed by a three-member board of trustees, who are elected in November of odd-numbered years to a four-year term beginning on the following January 1. Two are elected in the year after the presidential election and one is elected in the year before it. There is also an elected township fiscal officer, who serves a four-year term beginning on April 1 of the year after the election, which is held in November of the year before the presidential election. Vacancies in the fiscal officership or on the board of trustees are filled by the remaining trustees.

References

External links
County website

Townships in Ross County, Ohio
Townships in Ohio